Spencer Creek is a stream in Ralls and Pike counties of the U.S. state of Missouri. It is a tributary of the Salt River. The stream turns north then northeast and passes the village of Madisonville and continues roughly parallel to the boundary between Ralls and Pike counties. It enters briefly into Pike County just prior to passing under U.S. Route 61.

Spencer Creek has the name of William Spencer, a pioneer citizen.

See also
List of rivers of Missouri

References

Rivers of Pike County, Missouri
Rivers of Ralls County, Missouri
Rivers of Missouri